The Tank 500 is a full-size luxury SUV produced by Great Wall Motor.

Overview

The Tank 500 was revealed on 29 August 2021 at the Chengdu Auto Show, and is planned for sale in late 2021. 

It's the second model to be introduced from the brand after the Tank 300, and seats seven passengers across three rows.  

The SUV was revealed on 29 November 2021 with the Hybrid Engine at the Thailand International Motor Expo 2021.

Powertrain and technical details 

The TANK 500 is based on a body-on-frame chassis, locking front and rear differentials, and impressive off-road capability including  ground clearance, a  wading depth, and a 29.6º approach angle.

Interior 

The vehicle features a fully digital dashboard, with a 12.3-inch screen for the driver, and a 14.6-inch screen in the centre stack for infotainment.

References

External links
 Official Site 

Great Wall Motors vehicles
Cars introduced in 2021
Full-size sport utility vehicles
Luxury sport utility vehicles
All-wheel-drive vehicles
Hybrid electric cars